Montay is a commune in the Nord department in northern France. Montay has a population of 276 people (2019).

Heraldry

Monuments
Eglise Saint-Jean-Baptiste
Old Mill

See also
Communes of the Nord department

References

Communes of Nord (French department)